Griseargiolestes metallicus is a species of Australian damselfly in the family Megapodagrionidae,
commonly known as a metallic flatwing. 
It has only been recorded from rainforests in the vicinity of Tully Gorge National Park in northern Queensland, where it inhabits streams.

Griseargiolestes metallicus is a medium-sized damselfly, black-green metallic in colour with pale markings, without pruinescence.
Like other members of the family Megapodagrionidae, it rests with its wings outspread.

Gallery

See also
 List of Odonata species of Australia

References 

Megapodagrionidae
Odonata of Australia
Insects of Australia
Endemic fauna of Australia
Taxa named by Yngve Sjöstedt
Insects described in 1917
Damselflies